Get Squared is the second studio album by Nigerian recording artist P-Square, released in 2005 by Square Records. The album propelled the group to being musical superstars in their native Nigeria. With the success of the singles, "Bizzy Body", "Oga Police" and "Get Squared", the group established their celebrity status and sold over 5 million copies all over the country. The album was released under the Square record label and numerous videos were released from the album. The album's track list features few instrumentals, a trait of most P-Square albums. The album was heavily criticized for being too similar to western R&B hits and lacking of true original content.

On 15 May 2009, the album was released on iTunes.

Track listing

Personnel 
Peter Okoye – recording artist
Paul Okoye – recording artist
Aituaje Iruobe – featured artist
Jude Engees Okoye – director

Re-release history

References

External links 
The Official P-Square Website with songlyrics

2005 albums
P-Square albums
Igbo-language albums